is the governor of Ōita Prefecture in Japan, first elected in 2003. A native of Hita, Ōita and graduate of the University of Tokyo, he had worked at the Ministry of International Trade and Industry since 1966 before elected governor.

References

External links 
  
 Ooita Prefecture Office(Japanese)

Governors of Ōita
1942 births
Living people
University of Tokyo alumni

Politicians from Ōita Prefecture